Let There Be Love may refer to:

Songs 
"Let There Be Love" (1940 song), a 1940 song by composer Lionel Rand and lyricist Ian Grant
"Let There Be Love" (Bee Gees song)
"Let There Be Love" (Christina Aguilera song)
"Let There Be Love", a 1979 song by Dutch girl group Luv'
"Let There Be Love" (Melanie C song)
"Let There Be Love" (Oasis song)
"Let There Be Love" (Simple Minds song)

Albums 
Let There Be Love (John Pizzarelli album)
Let There Be Love (1953 Joni James album)
Let There Be Love (1993 Joni James album)
Let There Be Love (Gary Williams album)
Let There Be Love, a 2005 album by Engelbert Humperdinck
Let There Be Love, a 2007 album by Joe Dolan

Television 
Let There Be Love (TV series), a British sitcom from the early 1980s